Discovery Capital Management is an American hedge fund, with a focus on emerging markets. It was co-founded in 1999 by Robert Citrone, and employs 83 people.

References

Tiger Management
Hedge fund firms of the United States
Financial services companies established in 1999
1999 establishments in the United States